Spano may refer to:

People
 Alessandro Spanò, Italian footballer
 Andrew Spano, American politician
 Carlos Spano, Spanish soldier
 Charles A. Spano, Jr., American writer
 Chuck Spano, American musician
 Frank Spano, Venezuelan actor
 Giovanni Spano, Sardinian archaeologist and priest
 Joe Spano, American actor
 John Spano, American businessman and convicted fraudster
 Luciano Spano, Mexican painter
 Maxime Spano, French footballer
 Mike Spano, American politician
 Nicholas A. Spano, American politician
 Nick Spano, American actor
 Pippo Spano, Hungarian nobleman
 Róbert Ragnar Spanó, Icelandic/Italian judge
 Robert Spano, American conductor and pianist
 Romain Spano, French footballer
 Ross Spano, American politician
 Vincent Spano, American actor

Other
 Jessie Spano, character on TV series Saved by the Bell
 Spano Island, an Antarctic island
 GTA Spano, Spanish supercar
 Spano v. New York, U.S. Supreme Court case regarding due process

See also
 Spanos (disambiguation)